The Bard Music Festival is an annual classical music festival held during the month of August on the campus of Bard College in Annandale-on-Hudson, New York. Founded in 1990, the festival was created with the intention of finding ways to present the history of music in innovative ways to contemporary audiences. To this end, each year the festival selects a single composer to be its main focus and presents performances in tandem with presentations on biographical details on the subject and links to the worlds of literature, painting, theater, philosophy, and politics that would have influenced the life and works of the featured composer. The effort to bridge the worlds of performance and scholarship often results in a variety of concert formats and styles that often depart from the typical recital and concert structure. Concerts are frequently presented with informative preconcert talks, panel discussions by renowned musicians and scholars, and other special events. In addition, each season a book of essays, translations, and correspondence relating to the festival’s central figure is published by Princeton University Press. The festival is currently led by Artistic Directors Leon Botstein, and Irene Zedlacher.

The festival's first featured composer was Johannes Brahms in 1990. The 2022 festival is focused on the world and works of Sergei Rachmaninoff.

References

External links
Official website

Classical music festivals in the United States
Bard College
Annandale-on-Hudson, New York
Music festivals established in 1990
1990 establishments in New York (state)
Music festivals in New York (state)